UFO 2: Flying (sometimes called simply UFO 2 or Flying; also subtitled Space Rock) is the second studio album by English hard rock band UFO. It was released in October 1971 on the Beacon label. It was issued on CD in 1999 on Repertoire Records.

The album is distinctive for its title track, which was among the longest tracks recorded in rock music up to that point and easily the longest song the band ever recorded. The track finishes with a backmasked reading from Rudyard Kipling's Gunga Din, "Tho' I've belted you an' flayed you, By the livin' God that made you, You're a better man than I am, Gunga Din!", and a slowed phrase, "Yes we know, it's all been done before before before".

The album was reissued on the Flying, The Early Years compilation, along with all of the band's other work from before guitarist Michael Schenker joined the group.

Track listing

Personnel
UFO
 Phil Mogg – vocals
 Mick Bolton – guitar
 Pete Way – bass
 Andy Parker – drums

Production
Milton Samuel – executive producer

References

External links
 

1971 albums
Beacon Records albums
UFO (band) albums
Space rock albums
Decca Records albums
Stateside Records albums